The 350s decade ran from January 1, 350, to December 31, 359.

Significant people
 Constantius II, Roman Emperor
 Magnentius, Roman usurper
 Julian, Roman Emperor

References